DXWG (107.9 FM), broadcasting as 107.9 Radyo Natin,  is a radio station owned and operated by Manila Broadcasting Company through its licensee Pacific Broadcasting System. The station's studio is located along Sobrecarey St., Tagum.

References

Radio stations in Davao del Norte
Radio stations established in 1997